The Palace of Prolonging Happiness, or Yanxi Palace, is one of the Eastern Six Palaces in the inner court of the Forbidden City, situated behind the Hall for Ancestral Worship. Described as one of the most 'exotic' looking structures in the Forbidden City, the Palace of Prolonging Happiness was built in 1420 as the Palace of Longevity. From the Ming to the Qing dynasty, the palace was home to many imperial consorts and concubines. The palace was later destroyed by multiple fires between 1845 and 1855. The Empress Dowager Longyu ordered the palace to be rebuilt in 1909 with a new three-storey Western-style building included. Known as the 'Crystal Palace' (水晶宮) or Lingzhao Pavilion, the building was surrounded by a moat that was supposed to be filled with spring water from the Jade Source Mountain near Beijing. However, lack of funding and damage from a bombing raid in 1917 prevented the completion of the structure. Today, only the iron cast and marbles remain. In 1931, three two-storey warehouses were added to house the Palace Museum's artifacts. Since 2005, the warehouses have been used for the Ceramics Laboratory, the Research Centre for Ceramics, and the Research Centre for Traditional Calligraphy and Paintings.

The Palace of Prolonging Happiness is perhaps best known for its association with the popular Chinese TV period drama Story of Yanxi Palace.

See also
Story of Yanxi Palace
Empress Xiaoyichun

References

External links
 

Buildings and structures in Beijing
Forbidden City